Idiorophus is a genus of toothed whales in the family Physeteridae. Fossils have been found in the Colhuehuapian Gaiman Formation of Argentina and the Libano Sandstone in Italy.

The teeth of Idiorophus were similar in size to those of the modern orca.

References

Further reading 
 R. Kellogg. 1925. Two physeteroid whales from California. Contributions to Palaeontology from the Carnegie Institution of Washington 348(1):1–35
 R. Lydekker. 1894. Cetacean skulls from Patagonia. Anales del Museo de la Plata II:1–13

Toothed whales
Miocene mammals of Europe
Miocene mammals of South America
Colhuehuapian
Neogene Argentina
Fossils of Argentina
Gaiman Formation
Fossils of Italy
Fossil taxa described in 1925
Taxa named by Remington Kellogg